Dundee City Council is the local government authority for the City of Dundee. It was created in 1996 under the Local Government etc. (Scotland) Act 1994.

History 
Dundee City became a single-tier council in 1996, under the Local Government etc. (Scotland) Act 1994, with the boundaries of the City of Dundee district of the Tayside region, minus a Monifieth area and part of a Sidlaw area, which were transferred from the city area to the new council area of Angus. The city district was also the administrative centre for the region.

The new city council area was named The City of Dundee in the legislation of 1994, but this was changed to Dundee City by a council resolution on 29 June 1995, under section 23 of the Local Government (Scotland) Act 1973 (c. 65). In terms of area, it is the smallest of Scotland's council areas.

The district had been created in 1975, under the Local Government (Scotland) Act 1973, to include: the former county of city of Dundee; a Monifieth area, including the burgh of Monifieth (but not Newtyle and Kettins areas), previously within the county of Angus; and a Longforgan area previously within the county of Perth.

The county of city was created in 1894, and the city area has included the burgh of Broughty Ferry since 1913. Dundee has been a royal burgh since 1191.

Elections

Elections to the council are held on a five-year cycle. Councillors are elected from subdivisions of the city area called wards. They were previously elected from 29 single-member wards by the plurality (first past the post) voting system. As a result of the Local Governance (Scotland) Act 2004, eight new wards were introduced for the 2007 election, each electing three or four members by the single transferable vote system of election, to produce a form of proportional representation. The total number of councillors remained the same.

The last election to take place was on 5 May 2022 which resulted in the SNP gaining a majority for the first time since 2019 after gaining a seat from Labour in the West End ward. 

The election saw the Liberal Democrats replace the Conservatives as the third largest party whilst Labour remained in opposition. 

Both Labour and the Liberal Democrats won seats at the expense of the Conservatives who lost two of their three seats in the West End and The Ferry wards.

Wards

Criticism 
In 2021 during the COVID-19 pandemic, the council was criticised for not publishing bus timetable information at bus stops.

See also
 Politics of Dundee

Notes

References

Edinburgh
Politics of Dundee
Organisations based in Dundee